Alniaria yuana, (syns. Sorbus yuana, Aria yuana) Yu's whitebeam, is a species of flowering plant in the family Rosaceae, native to Chongqing, and western Hubei, China.

A shapely tree reaching , with white flowers, red fruit, and yellow autumn foliage, it appears to be resistant to fire blight, and so is a good candidate for further development as an ornamental. It is used as a street tree in Aarhus, Denmark.

References

yuana
Trees of China
Endemic flora of China
Flora of Chongqing
Flora of Hubei
Plants described in 2018